Morgan Murphy is the name of:

Morgan Murphy (food critic) (born 1972), food critic and author
Morgan Murphy (baseball) (1867–1938), former catcher in Major League Baseball
Morgan Murphy (comedian) (born 1981), standup comedian and comedy writer
Morgan F. Murphy (1932–2016), former US Representative from Illinois, 1971–1981
Morgan Murphy Media, radio and television broadcasting chain, based in Madison, Wisconsin